The  was held in 2012 in Yokohama, Kanagawa, Japan.

Awards
 Best Film:  - Someday
 Best Director: Sion Sono - Cold Fish and Guilty of Romance
 Best New Director:
 Mami Sunada - Ending Note
 Kōji Maeda - Konzen Tokkyū
 Best Screenplay: Aya Watanabe (refused) - Sono Machi no Kodomo Gekijōban
 Best Cinematographer: Junichi Fujisawa - Rebirth
 Best Actor: Eita - Tada's Do-It-All House
 Best Actress: Yuriko Yoshitaka - Konzen Tokkyū
 Best Supporting Actor: Denden - Cold Fish
 Best Supporting Actress:
 Megumi Kagurazaka - Cold Fish and Guilty of Romance
 Asuka Kurosawa - Cold Fish
 Best Newcomer:
 Tori Matsuzaka - We Can't Change the World. But, We Wanna Build a School in Cambodia. and Antoki no Inochi
 Kiki Sugino - Kantai
 Kenta Hamano - Konzen Tokkyū
 Yokohama Film Festival Best Actor: Yoshio Harada

Best 10
 Someday
 Cold Fish
 Rebirth
 Guilty of Romance
 Postcard
 Antoki no Inochi
 Moteki
 Konzen Tokkyū
 Ending Note
 Tada's Do-It-All House

References

Yokohama Film Festival
Yokohama Film Festival
Yokohama Film Festival
2012 in Japanese cinema